Talha Talib (born 3 October 1999) is a Pakistani weightlifter from Gujranwala.
He is the Pakistani national champion in the 62 kg category. He set a new record at the games in snatch as he lifted 132 kg in the third attempt with 127 kg and 130 kg in the first two attempts, respectively. He was also a gold medalist at the 2016 Commonwealth Youth Weightlifting Championships in Penang. He lifted 258 kg to clinch the gold. He is currently the top No. 1 ranked weightlifter of Pakistan.

Early life and education 
Talib began training from the age of eight in his hometown of Gujranwala, Pakistan. His father, Muhammad Islam Natiq, was a former National Junior Weightlifting Champion and had won a bronze medal at the 1999 Asian Powerlifting Championships in New Delhi. He worked as a national weightlifting coach for Pakistan, and was the one who introduced Talib to the sport.

Talib passed his matriculation from Quaid-e-Azam Divisional Public School and College, and then studied computer science from Superior College, Gujranwala.

Career 
Talha Talib won the silver medal in the 56 kg category at the 2015 Commonwealth Youth Games in Samoa. He lifted 102 kg in snatch and 115 kg in clean and jerk for an aggregate of 217 kg. In October 2016, he participated in the IWF Youth World Championships in Penang, where he could only achieve 9th position in the 62 kg category. The next week, at the 2016 Commonwealth Youth Championships in Penang, he claimed silver in the 62 kg category, and was named Best Weightlifter.

He competed at the 2018 Commonwealth Games and won a bronze medal in the 62 kg category, lifting a total of 283 kg at the age of 18.

At the 2019 South Asian Games, Talib won gold in 67 kg category with a total weight of 292 kg (140 kg in snatch and 152 kg in clean and jerk).

In February 2020, while competing in the 67 kg category at the 6th International Solidarity Weightlifting Championship in Tashkent, Talib secured a gold medal in snatch by lifting 142 kg. He also won gold in clean and jerk with a weight of 162 kg. This aggregate weight of 304 kg helped him claim another gold. In April 2020, at the 49th Asian Weightlifting Championships, he won a bronze medal by lifting 148 kg in snatch in 67 kg event.

He was brought into the national limelight at the following Olympics, where he finished fifth in the men's 67 kg event. Initially, Talib could not qualify directly for the event since he had missed a few events. However, he secured an invitational spot offered by the Tripartite Commission. At the event, Talib's lift of 151 kg in the snatch category was the second-best of the round. His overall tally of 320 kg was just 2 kg shy of the bronze medal. This was Pakistan's first top 5 position at the Olympics since 1988 in sports other than field hockey.

In the 2021 World Weightlifting Championships in Tashkent, Talib won the bronze medal in the 67 kg category by lifting 143 kg in the snatch event. This was Pakistan's first-ever medal at the World Weightlifting Championships.

However, Talib soon after tested positive for norandrosterone, a banned performance-enhancing drug, and was provisionally suspended.

Awards and recognition 
For securing fifth position in the men's 67 kg event at 2020 Summer Olympics, Talha was awarded the following:
  from the WAPDA.
  from the Chief Minister of Punjab.
  from the President of Pakistan.
  from the Punjab Sports Board.
  from the Government of Punjab.

References

External links

Talha Talib on Eurosport

Living people
People from Gujranwala District
Pakistani Muslims
Pakistani Sunni Muslims
Weightlifters at the 2018 Commonwealth Games
Weightlifters at the 2018 Asian Games
Pakistani male weightlifters
Commonwealth Games medallists in weightlifting
Commonwealth Games bronze medallists for Pakistan
1999 births
Asian Games competitors for Pakistan
Weightlifters at the 2020 Summer Olympics
Olympic weightlifters of Pakistan
20th-century Pakistani people
21st-century Pakistani people
Medallists at the 2018 Commonwealth Games